Tholsel was a name traditionally used for a local municipal and administrative building used to collect tolls and taxes and to administer trade and other documents in Irish towns and cities. It was at one stage one of the most important secular buildings in Ireland's town and cities and the level of importance was reflected in the prominence and size of these buildings as well as the expensive materials and architectural techniques used. Some historic tholsels still exist, notably The Tholsel, Kilkenny. Towards the end of the 18th century the term tholsel was typically swapped for Market House with many of the administrative functions of the original tholsel transferring to another dedicated local council or government building such as a court or sessions house.

Similar buildings called tolseys or tolsey houses are found in some English towns and cities, including Burford, Gloucester and Wotton-under-Edge. In both cases the term is derived from the Middle English tolsell, from tol ("toll") + -sell (Old English sele "hall", "house"). However, buildings described as a Tholsel have been more broadly used as a town hall, a courthouse, a town gate, a prison, a market house, a council chamber, a customs house, a guildhall, and a place where tolls were collected. In Scotland the term Tolbooth was used.

The Tholsel building in Dublin was built in the late Middle Ages as a merchants' hall, at the corner of Nicholas Street and Christ Church place, next to the Church of St. Nicholas Within. In the late 15th century, it was the home of the first mechanical public clock in Ireland.  In the late eighteenth century, the Dublin Tholsel was used as a courthouse, being notable as the location where many Irish people, convicted of crimes, were sentenced to be transported to exile in Australia.  It was demolished around the year 1820.

Notable tholsels in the Republic of Ireland

See also 

Market Houses in the Republic of Ireland
Market Houses in Northern Ireland
Tolbooth for some of the equivalent buildings in Scotland
Tolsey.

References 

Government buildings in the Republic of Ireland
Toll houses
Market houses
Guildhalls in Ireland